Dyakia is a genus of air-breathing land snails, terrestrial pulmonate gastropod mollusks in the family Dyakiidae.

Dyakia is the type genus of the family Dyakiidae.

Species
The genus Dyakia include 22 species:

Dyakia chlorosoma Vermeulen, Liew & Schilthuizen, 2015
 Dyakia clypeus (Mousson, 1857)
 Dyakia densestriata Schepman, 1896
 Dyakia euconus Sykes, 1905
 Dyakia granaria (Bock, 1881)
Dyakia janus (Beck, 1837)
 Dyakia kintana (De Morgan, 1885)
 Dyakia mackensiana (Souleyet, 1841)
Dyakia moluensis Godwin-Austen, 1891
 Dyakia hugonis (L. Pfeiffer, 1863) - the type species
 Dyakia perstriata Sykes, 1905
 Dyakia? retrorsa
 Dyakia rumphii (Von Den Busch, 1842)
 Dyakia salangana (Martens, 1883)
 Dyakia sannio (Pfeiffer, 1854)

Synonyms:
 Dyakia striata is a synonym for Quantula striata, the only known terrestrial gastropod to emit light

References

External links
 http://malacos.chez.com/htm/J78G7.HTM

Dyakiidae